Ashtakhu (also Romanized as Āshtākhū; also known as Eshtā Khān, Āshtākhūn, Eshtadkhūn, Eshtākhan, Eshtākhoon, Eshtākhūn, Eshtāqān, and Ishtākhūn) is a village in Kahshang Rural District, in the Central District of Birjand County, South Khorasan Province, Iran. At the 2016 census, its population was 81, in 28 families.

References 

Populated places in Birjand County